Riccordia is a genus of birds in the hummingbird family Trochilidae. They are endemic to the Caribbean.

Species
The species now placed in this genus were formerly assigned to the genus Chlorostilbon. A molecular phylogenetic study published in 2014 found that Chlorostilbon was polyphyletic. In the revised classification to create monophyletic genera, these species, as well as the blue-headed hummingbird in the monotypic Cyanophaia, were moved to the resurrected genus Riccordia that had been introduced in 1854 by the German ornithologist Ludwig Reichenbach with the Cuban emerald as the type species. The two extinct species, Brace's emerald and Gould's emerald, were not included in the phylogenetic studies and thus their placement is uncertain. Reichenbach based the genus name on the specific epithet of the type species, recordii, which had been chosen by Paul Gervais to honour the French surgeon-naturalist Alexandre Ricord (born 1798).

The genus contains five species, of which one is extinct:
Blue-headed hummingbird, Riccordia bicolor
Puerto Rican emerald, Riccordia maugaeus 
Cuban emerald, Riccordia ricordii
Hispaniolan emerald, Riccordia swainsonii
† Brace's emerald, Riccordia bracei

References

Riccordia
Bird genera
Taxa named by Ludwig Reichenbach
Higher-level bird taxa restricted to the West Indies